The Hughes House at 414 Sibley Street in Benton in Bossier Parish in northwestern Louisiana, was built in about 1840.  It was listed on the National Register of Historic Places in 1996.

It was delisted in September 1996, and re-enlisted with actual reference number after its move in October 1996.

References

See also
National Register of Historic Places listings in Bossier Parish, Louisiana

Houses on the National Register of Historic Places in Louisiana
Greek Revival architecture in Louisiana
Houses completed in 1840
Bossier Parish, Louisiana
1840 establishments in Louisiana